Graziano Battistini (born 30 September 1970) is a retired Italian football goalkeeper. He previously played for Seregno, Udinese, SPAL, U.S. Alessandria, Verona, Treviso, Bari and Casale.

External links 
  Statistics at Football Database

1970 births
Sportspeople from Monza
Living people
Italian footballers
Serie A players
Serie B players
Serie C players
U.S. 1913 Seregno Calcio players
S.S.C. Bari players
Udinese Calcio players
S.P.A.L. players
Hellas Verona F.C. players
Treviso F.B.C. 1993 players
U.S. Alessandria Calcio 1912 players
Casale F.B.C. players
Association football goalkeepers
Footballers from Lombardy